Athanasius V Gabriel Matar was Patriarch of the Melkite Greek Catholic Church for a few months in 1813.

Life 
Gabriel Matar was born in Damascus. He was the brother of patriarch Agapius II Matar and, as his brother, he too entered in the religious order of the Basilian Salvatorians. Gabriel Matar studied in Rome for a short period and was ordained priest in 1782. In 1798 he was consecrated bishop of Hauran by his brother patriarch Agapius II Matar, and in 1800 he was transferred to the diocese of Saida.

On 14 August 1813 Gabriel Matar was elected patriarch, under the name Athanasius, by a synod of bishops held at Ain Traz Seminary. His election had no time to be confirmed by the Roman Congregation of Propaganda Fide because he died on 20 November 1813.

Notes 

Syrian Melkite Greek Catholics
Melkite Greek Catholic Patriarchs of Antioch
1813 deaths
Eastern Catholic monks
Year of birth unknown
People from Damascus